Iona Island may refer to:

Iona, an island in the Inner Hebrides, Scotland
Iona Island (British Columbia), formerly an island, now a peninsula physically connected to Sea Island via a causeway and Ferguson Road
Iona Island (New York), a bedrock island of the Hudson River in the town of Stony Point, about one mile south of the Bear Mountain Bridge, and part of Bear Mountain State Park

See also
 Iona (disambiguation)
 Iony Island